Standard sea-level conditions (SSL), also known as sea-level standard (SLS), defines a set of atmospheric conditions for physical calculations.
The term "standard sea level" is used to indicate that values of properties are to be taken to be the same as those standard at sea level, and is done to define values for use in general calculations.

Atmospheric properties
At SSL some atmospheric properties are:

 Pressure, P = 101.325 kPa ⇔ 2116.2 lbf/ft2 ⇔ 14.696 lbf/in2 ⇔ 29.92 inHg
 Density,  = 1.225 kg/m3  ⇔ 0.002377  slug/ft3
 Temperature, T = 15 °C ⇔ 288.15 K ⇔ 518.67 °R
 Gas constant of air, Rair = 287.057 J/(kg·K) ⇔ 1716.59  ft·lb/sl·°R)
 Specific Weight,  = 12.014 N/m3 ⇔ 0.07647 lbf/ft3
 Dynamic viscosity,  = 1.789×10−5 Pa·s  ⇔ 3.737×10−7 slug/(s·ft)
 Acceleration of gravity, g0 = 9.807 m/s2 ⇔ 32.174 ft/s2

See also 
 Sea level
 Sea level rise
 Standard temperature and pressure

References

Atmosphere